Axel Pretzsch (born 16 June 1976) is a former professional tennis player from Germany.

Career
Pretzsch, who was Germany's junior champion in 1990 and 1994, played in the main draw of four Grand Slams during his career. He twice made it into the second round, the first time at the 1999 US Open, where he beat Cyril Saulnier, before losing to eventual champion Andre Agassi. The German also reached the second round in the 2000 Australian Open, beating Alex O'Brien.

His best result on the ATP Tour came at the 1999 President's Cup in Tashkent, where he had to best win of his career, defeating world number 60 Sargis Sargsian en route to the quarter-finals.

ATP Challenger and ITF Futures finals

Singles: 11 (6–5)

Doubles: 1 (1–0)

Performance timeline

Singles

References

External links
 
 

1976 births
Living people
German male tennis players
Tennis players from Hamburg